The history of the Jews in Odesa dates to 16th century. Since the modern city's founding in 1795, Odesa has been home to one of the largest population of Jews in what is today Ukraine. They comprised the largest ethno-religious group in the region throughout most of the 19th century and until the mid-20th century.

Background
Jews have been a part of the region's economic activities for many centuries. Starting in 16th century, Jews from the Polish Crown had been settling in what is today southern Ukraine, working as merchants, importers and translators among the Cossacks in the Zaporozhian Sich. They were also active in exporting goods from Crimea to the mainland and owned a substantial share of the stores and taverns in the region.

The early Jewish settlers in the region were possibly Sephardi Jews, who had migrated from Crimea. Several tombstones written in Hebrew dated between 1765 and 1789 have been found in the region.

Initial growth
By 1799, the Jewish population of the city numbered 317, comprising 187 males and 130 females. Around this period, there were multiple Jewish religious institutions, including a burial society, a synagogue, and a school for orphans named Talmud Torah. A hekdesh (workhouse) was built and a Kehillah (commune) was organised. 

Immigration to the region happened in two distinct waves during the first two decades of 19th century, on which the remote and newly formed Jewish community relied heavily for its growth. As Steven Zipperstein argues, Jewish immigrants "looked upon Odesa, with its wide streets and limestone buildings, as a world apart from the ancient settlements to which they were accustomed, and Odesa came to represent to Jews elsewhere […] the option of a fresh start, offering a change in climate, economic possibilities, and perimeters of acceptable religious behavior".

Economic life
Jewish participation in commerce played an important role in the city, despite the number of Jews declining from 240 in 1794 to 135 in 1797. According to a report from the latter year, the Jews possessed most of the city's commercial capital and dominated commodity trade in items such as silk, cotton, wool, hardware, iron, and shoes and largely controlled the export of salt. Many Jews also worked for the Russian army as petty traders or artisans while they were stationed in the fortress. However, only two Jews were wealthy enough to register themselves under the kuptsy (merchants) category in 1801. The richer Jews lived largely in the centre of the city, while the poor were concentrated in Moldavanka and the Peresyp region.

Second wave

The second wave of settlers, who came from Volhynia, Podilia, White Russia and the town of Brody, arrived immediately following the first one. These new settlers grew aware of the potential importance of the Russian Black Sea port and were trying to profit from fluctuations on the grain market. More arrivals of Jewish families came from city of Kherson. 

In contrast to the first wave, where people came individually, the second wave was characterized by arrival of families. Between 1809 and 1819, Odesa become a city of international importance, which gave the Jewish community in the region a wide range of opportunities. The process of immigration also weakened the normally strict adherence to religious activities. For example, on one evening in 1817, the city's rabbi Berish Ben Yisrael was beaten to death in the streets by a group of Jews who were unhappy with stringent observation of ritual law.

Galician Jews
Around the 1830s, Galician Jews dominated the roles of middlemen and agents in the grain trade of the city, while also being employed as bankers, merchants, and brokers, with 86% of brokers in Odesa being Jewish. Emerging as the wealthiest sector of the Jews, they took control of local Kehillah. Even after the Russian government had dissolved all Jewish Kehillah in 1844, the Odesa Kehillah continued to function as a semi-autonomous body in the region, whose meetings were held at regular intervals. 

Between 1837 and 1844, the number of Jewish merchants who were members of the kuptsy category increased from 169 to 221. In 1842, 228 businesses, 67 factories and workshops, and 26 crockery stores in the city were owned by Jews. By 1850, Jews had become the fastest-growing group in city commerce and constituted its majority − out of 5,466 individuals engaged in the commercial economy in 1851, 2,907 (53.2%) were Jews. 

In 1826, Galician Jews opened a modern elementary school, which taught secular as well as Jewish subjects. Despite the opposition of Jewish traditionalists, headed by Moshe Tsvi, this act was supported by city authorities. In the first year, over 250 students had enrolled in the school. Max Lilienthal noted that in 1842 the school had around 400–500 students. In 1852, when the school was merged into the state school system, this number increased to 2,500.

Synagogues

In the 1840s, the "Brody" Jews leased their first synagogue, at the corner of Pushkin and Postal (now Zhukovsky) streets in a relatively small house, from the wealthy Greek businessman Ksenysu. The Cantor was Rabbi Nissan Blumenthal, who had come from the town of Brody. The reformation of synagogues was one of the priorities of Maskilim in the city, which proved a success, as the Brodsky Synagogue soon become the model for Jewish prayer in the region. The older Glavaina synagogue, formerly known as Beit Knesset Ha Gadol, established in 1795 and located on the main arteries of the city (Rishelevskaia Ulitsa), was renovated on the model of the Brody Synagogue. 

In 1863, the Brody Synagogue announced its commitment to build a new structure. The purchase of a dedicated lot and construction cost 35,646 rubles, contributed by 197 individuals. It was designed by architect Joseph N. Kollovich in the Gothic Florentine style. Built with local limestone, the synagogue, which became the largest in the southern regions of the Russian Empire, was completed in 1863 and served as a local landmark of Moorish architecture. The Brody Synagogue become the most prominent synagogue in Odesa and the first modern synagogue in the Russian Empire.

The 19th century
Under the reign of Nicholas I, the persecution of Jews become official. The major provisions regarding Jews under his reign included: conscription of Jews, including their children, which was passed in 1827; provisions regarding travel and settlement restrictions, signed into law in 1835; abolition of Qahal system in 1844; expulsions of Jewish populations from Kyiv, Kherson, and Sevastopol; and bans regarding use of Hebrew and Yiddish in public. The Tsar also issued an 1844 decree providing for creation of new Jewish schools, similar to district and governmental schools, which were aimed at assimilation of Jews. 

Due to the blockade of Odesa port during the Crimean war and subsequent disruption of trade, the city's exports rapidly dropped tenfold from 1853 to 1855. The losses forced Greek magnates of the city to close their offices, and the city failed to recover its lost clients following the war. However, unlike the Greeks, the Jews were able to withstand the recession due to their close contact with the producers, which greatly improved their ability to assess the market and allowed them to trade with a smaller profit margin. As a result, the Greek stake in the export trade was quickly superseded by that of the Jews. By 1872–1875, Jews owned 60% of the commercial firms and most of retail stores in the city. 

During 1860s, the city become a center of modern Jewish intelligentsia. With Yiddish being spoken by almost a third of the population, the city rose as a centre of Yiddish literature during the 1860s, playing a large role in the cultural transformation of Russian Jewry. Many of the most successful Jewish institutions existed in Odesa, which attracted many Jewish intellectuals from across Russia. 

The community had, however, fallen victim to increased tensions with other nationalities, which eventually evolved into open anti-Semitism. During the 1821 anti-Jewish riots in Odesa, which occurred after the death of the Greek Orthodox patriarch in Constantinople, 14 Jews were killed. Overall, the pogroms in Odesa were carried out in 1821, 1859, 1871, 1881, and 1905, although the Jewish Encyclopedia does not count the 1821 riot as an instance of such. The term became common after a wave of large-scale anti-Jewish violence swept the southern Russian Empire, including Ukraine, between 1881 and 1884, incited by rumours blaming Jews for the assassination of Alexander II. 

Additionally, the May Laws of 1882 gave impetus to political activism among Russian Jews and mass emigration. More than two million Jews fled Russia between 1881 and 1920, the vast majority emigrating to the United States and the Ottoman region that became Palestine, and the city became an important base of support for Zionism.

In 1882, members of Bilu and Hovevei Zion made what came to be known as the First Aliyah to Palestine, then a part of the Ottoman Empire. Initially, these organizations were not official, and to attain a legally recognized framework, a Jewish organization had to be registered as a charity in various European countries; American Jews provided most of the funding. After arduous negotiations, the Russian government approved the establishment of the Society for the Support of Jewish Farmers and Artisans in Syria and Palestine, also known as the Odesa Committee, in early 1890. It was based in Odesa, headed by Leon Pinsker, and dedicated to practical aspects of establishing Jewish agricultural settlements in Palestine. The Tsarist government also sporadically encouraged Jewish emigration. Before the First Zionist Congress in 1897, the Odesa Committee counted over 4,000 members. When the Zionist Organization was founded in 1897, most of the Hovevei Zion societies joined it. The Odesa Committee continued to function until it was closed in 1913. 

Despite the efforts to promote Zionism and subsequent emigration, however, the share of Jews in the population of Odesa remained fairly constant, at about 35%. Even after World War I and the Russian Civil War, there were more than 150,000 Jews in Odesa, constituting 36.7% of the total population.

Second World War and beyond
 

During the Second World War, Odesa was attacked by the combined forces of Romanian and German troops in August 1941. Following the 73-day Siege of Odesa, the city was captured and put under Romanian administration, becoming the capital of the Transnistria Governorate. On 23 October, with the arrival of Axis forces in the city, an order was issued directing all people of Jewish origin to report to the village of Dalnyk the following day; around 5,000 Jews obeyed. The first 50 people were brought to the anti-tank ditch and shot by the commander of the 10th machine-gun battalion, Lieutenant-Colonel Nicolae Deleanu. Between 5,000 and 10,000 Jews were killed and many were taken hostage. During the first week of the Romanians' stay in Odesa, the city lost about 10% of its population. 

Approximately 25,000 Odesan Jews were murdered on the outskirts of the city and over 35,000 deported; this came to be known as the Odesa massacre. Most of the atrocities were committed during the first six months of the occupation and perpetrated by Einsatzgruppen death squads. By 17 October 1941, 80% of the 210,000 Jews in the region had been killed. This was in contrast to Jews in Romania proper, where the majority survived. 

When the Nazi forces had lost ground in the Eastern Front, the Romanian administration amended its policy and declined to deport the remaining Jewish population of eastern Europe to extermination camps situated in German-occupied Poland, while allowing Jews to work as hired labourers. In contrast to other areas of occupied Eastern Europe, the survival of Jewish population was significantly higher in Odesa. After the war, Jews constituted more than ten percent of Odesa's population, and could be found in most occupational groups from port stevedores and unskilled workers to the intellectual elite. 

Since the 1970s, the majority of the remaining Jewish population emigrated in two distinct aliyahs, one in the 1970s and the other after the dissolution of the Soviet Union. Emigrants went mainly to Israel, but some also moved to the Jewish Autonomous Oblast or other countries, shrinking the Jewish community in the region.

Historical demographics
From 1880 to 1920, Odesa had the second largest Jewish population in the Russian Empire.

During its founding year (1795), the city's population was recorded at 2,500 people. In 1848, the city's population had risen to over 90,000 people, making it the third-largest city in the Russian Empire. This growth was due to mass inflows of immigrants, leading to increases of population from 86,729 in 1849 to 193,500 in 1873. In 1826, the Jews comprised 89% of the total population in the city. The population rose to 404,000 in 1892, with Jews comprising the second-largest group. There were 198,233 Russians followed by 124,511 Jews (49.09% and 30.83% of the population, respectively). However only 38.5% of the Jews were born in the city. Accordingly the Jewish population of southern provinces in New Russia had increased by 333% between 1844 and 1880, and Jews comprised around 5.6% of the total population of Russia.

Gallery

Synagogues

Footnotes

References

 
Jews
Odesa

Further reading
 Zipperstein, Steven (1991). The Jews of Odessa: A Cultural History, 1794–1881. ISBN 0-8047-1962-4